Tatale-Sangule District is one of the sixteen districts in Northern Region, Ghana. Originally it was formerly part of the then-larger Zabzugu-Tatale District in 1988, which was created from the former East Dagomba District Council, until the northeast part of the district was split off to create Tatale-Sangule District on 28 June 2012; thus the remaining part has been renamed as Zabzugu District. The district assembly is located in the eastern part of Northern Region and has Tatale as its capital town.

References

Districts of the Northern Region (Ghana)